Cetonia carthami is a beetle of the family Scarabaeidae also known as the Sardinia rose chafer.

References

External links

Cetoniinae
Beetles of Europe
Beetles described in 1833